John Caldwell Calhoun II (1843–1918) was an American planter and businessman. He was a large landowner in Chicot County, Arkansas and a Director of railroad companies. He was a prominent financier and developer of the "New South".

Early life
He was born on July 9, 1843 in Demopolis, Alabama. His father, Andrew Pickens Calhoun, was a planter. He had a brother, Patrick Calhoun. His paternal grandfather, John C. Calhoun, served as the Vice President of the United States from 1825 to 1832.

He was educated in Demopolis, Alabama. He graduated from South Carolina College in 1863.

During the American Civil War of 1861–1865, he served in the Confederate States Army (CSA).

Career
In 1866, Calhoun entered in a partnership with James R. Powell, a businessman from Montgomery, Alabama, whereby he moved freedmen from the Southeast to Yazoo County, Mississippi, where they worked on new plantations. A year later, he decided to do this on his own, and on a larger scale. Over the years, he moved over 5,000 freedmen from North Carolina, South Carolina, Georgia and Alabama to the Yazoo Valley of Mississippi.

By 1869, Calhoun moved to the Florence Plantation in Chicot County, Arkansas, which was inherited by his wife through her mother. By 1881–1882, he acquired a few more plantations in Chicot County: Harwood, Hebron, Luna, Fawnwood, Patria, Hyner's, and Latrobe. He also acquired the Sunnyside Plantation from the Starling family for US$90,000. He also acquired the Lakeport Plantation from his mother-in-law. He established the Calhoun Land Company, the Florence Planting Company, and the Chicot Planting Company. He teamed up with investors J. Baxter Upham of Boston and Austin Corbin of New York City. However, due to heavy debt, by 1885, he let his brother divest of their Arkansas landholdings.

Meanwhile, Calhoun moved to New York City, where he invested in the construction of Southern railways. He served as on the Board of Directors of railroad companies. He became the majority proprietor of the Baltimore Coal Mining and Railway Company. He sued the United States Shipbuilding Company.

Personal life
He married Linnie Adams on December 8, 1870 in Marengo County, Alabama. She was the daughter of Betsy Johnson and grandniece of Richard Johnson, who served as the Vice President of the United States from 1837 to 1841. They had three sons and one daughter.

Death
He died on December 18, 1918 at his home 200 West Fifty-eighth Street, in Manhattan. He was buried at the Saint Philips Episcopal Church Cemetery in Charleston, South Carolina.

References

External links

1843 births
1918 deaths
People from Demopolis, Alabama
People from Chicot County, Arkansas
People from Manhattan
American planters
Confederate States Army personnel
Calhoun family
University of South Carolina alumni